The following is a list of the oldest buildings and structures in Hong Kong.

Before 1800

Although Hong Kong was sparsely populated prior to the arrival of the British, the area has a number of historic structures:

19th century

Most of the buildings built during this period was by the British and mostly on Hong Kong Island and the Kowloon Peninsula:

Early 20th century

Post-World War II

See also

 Declared monuments of Hong Kong
 Heritage conservation in Hong Kong
 Old Industrial Buildings Revitalization in Hong Kong

Oldest
Hong Kong